The following lists events that happened in 1988 in Libya.

Incumbents
 President: Muammar al-Gaddafi
 Prime Minister: Umar Mustafa al-Muntasir

Events

December
 December 21 - Pan Am Flight 103 is blown up over Lockerbie, Scotland, killing a total of 270 people. Those responsible are believed to be Libyans.

Births
 15 June - Muhammad Nashnoush.
 27 September - Mohamed Suleiman.
 27 September - Osama Chtiba.

References

 
Years of the 20th century in Libya
Libya
Libya
1980s in Libya